Mix 104.9 (call sign: 8MIX) is a radio station in Darwin, Northern Territory, Australia. It started broadcasting in 1997 - at the time, sister station Hot 100 was the only commercial radio station in Darwin - and has a relay in the remote town of Katherine (106.9 FM) as well as relays in smaller communities such as Pine Creek, Northern Territory, Adelaide River, Northern Territory and Bathurst Island, Northern Territory north of Darwin.

In November 2021, Mix 104.9, along with other stations owned by Grant Broadcasters, were acquired by the Australian Radio Network. This deal allows Grant's stations, including Mix 104.9, to access ARN's iHeartRadio platform in regional areas. The deal was finalized on January 4, 2022. It is expected Mix 104.9 will integrate with ARN's Pure Gold Network, but will retain its current name according to the press release from ARN.

The current line up is Mix Brekky with Dan and Sare, featuring legendary gamer and MC Daniel Hilliard, and producer and podcaster Sarah Beins, Breakfast 5.30am to 9am. The breakfast show features the promotion Secret Sound, one of Darwin's longest running and richest on air competition.

The talkback morning show 360 with Katie Woolf from 9am  12pm is Darwin's most influential local talk back show. It features the highly popular and often controversial Week That Was panel every Friday, with regular guests from the Country Liberal Party,  NT Government, Independent members of parliament and the media.

Sarah (Passalick) hosts afternoons, kicking off with the 80's hour at 12pm, afternoons from 1pm and then The Drive Home with Andrew (Thain) from 3pm  7pm.

AFL on Mix 104.9FM - in 2014 Mix 104.9FM commenced broadcasting the Australian Football League premiership series. Friday evening, Saturday, Saturday Nights and Sunday evenings.

Sarah Passalick is the current PD and General Manager Michael Harvey

Mix 104.9 Number of Listeners ( 2017)

Breakfast (5:30am  9am): 36,800  
Mornings (9am  12pm): 24,300  
Afternoon (12pm  4pm): 27,100  
Drive (4pm  7pm): 33,700  
Evening (7pm  12am): 3,700  
Weekend (Sat-Sun 5:30am  12am): 29,300

References

External links
Official website

Radio stations in Darwin, Northern Territory
Radio stations established in 1997
Adult contemporary radio stations in Australia
Australian Radio Network